Ramón Collazo (January 25, 1901July 16, 1981) was a Tango pianist, composer, actor.
was born in the now extinct Red-light district of the Barrio Sur of Montevideo, Uruguay, where his father owned a grocery. His brother Juan Antonio Collazo also was a Tango pianist and composer.

In his prolific oeuvre, there are very important titles including such standouts as: Agua florida, Golondrina, Blanca nieve, Adios Susana, Mamá, yo quiero un novio, Sevilla, Si lo supiera Mamá, San Antonio, Malvaloca, Sevilla, Portuguesa, Hombrecito, Tilin-tilon, Buenos dias, Palan, palan, Fado fadiño, Adiós mi barrio, Madrigal Veneciano, Volverás, Ay mamá, quiero casarme, Aquel Pierrot, Jacaranda, Pato, La chicharra, Qué quieren con el Charleston, Venganza, A la luz de la luna, Boquita de rosa, Ya ... ya ..., Casarme! ... Nunca, Pajarito cantor, Vieja loca, and, furthermore, he ventured in other genres: folk songs, foxtrot and maxixes.

He was also involved in several theatrical, radio, television, Carnival and movie projects and he starred in the film : Soltero soy feliz (1938).

References

External links

1901 births
1981 deaths
Uruguayan male film actors
Uruguayan pianists
Male pianists
Uruguayan male musicians
People from Montevideo
Tango musicians
Uruguayan composers
Male composers
Uruguayan musicians
Uruguayan television presenters
20th-century Uruguayan male actors
20th-century pianists
20th-century composers
RCA Victor artists
20th-century male musicians